Miller Brook is a tributary of North Branch Mehoopany Creek in Wyoming County, Pennsylvania, in the United States. The stream is not designated as an impaired waterbody. Wild trout naturally reproduce in the stream, and several other fish species have been observed.

Course
Miller Brook begins near Pennsylvania Route 187 in North Branch Township, near the Wyoming County/Bradford County line. It flows south-southeast for a few tenths of a mile, crossing Pennsylvania Route 187, before turning south and receiving an unnamed tributary from the left. The stream continues flowing south for several tenths of a mile through a valley between Shingle Ridge and Oak Ridge. It then reaches a wetland and turns south-southeast, flowing between Oak Ridge and Round Top. Here, it receives an unnamed tributary from the right before leaving the valley and turning east-southeast for a few tenths of a mile. The stream then turns south and crosses Pennsylvania Route 87 before reaching its confluence with North Branch Mehoopany Creek.

Hydrology
Miller Brook is not designated as an impaired waterbody.

Geography and geology

Miller Brook and its tributaries pass through gaps between several hills, including Oak Ridge, Round Top, and Shingle Ridge. A number of ponds and wetlands occur in the stream's watershed, and one of its tributaries extends into Bradford County.

Watershed
The stream is entirely within the United States Geological Survey quadrangle of Jenningsville. It joins North Branch Mehoopany Creek at Lovelton.

Miller Brook flows through a mixture of both agricultural and forested land. In the stream's lower , 39 percent of the stream's length is within  of a road, while all of it is within  of one. In 2000, the population density of the stream's watershed was 3 people per square kilometer (8 per square mile), putting it in a multi-way tie for the least densely populated sub-watershed of North Branch Mehoopany Creek.

History
Miller Brook was entered into the Geographic Names Information System on August 2, 1979. Its identifier in the Geographic Names Information System is 1181207.

A  concrete tee beam bridge carrying Pennsylvania Route 87 was built over Miller Brook in 1932. A  concrete tee beam bridge carrying State Route 4001 was built over the stream in 1958. A bridge replacement project for the Pennsylvania Route 87 bridge has been listed on a Pennsylvania Department of Transportation website.

Pennsylvania Fish and Boat Commission biologists performed a fish sampling and other studies on the streams in the North Branch Mehoopany Creek watershed, including Miller Brook, in 2001. The study found that the stream was too narrow to qualify for trout stocking and too warm to support wild trout.

Biology
Wild trout naturally reproduce in Miller Brook. The stream is classified as a Coldwater Fishery.

In a 2001 study, eight fish species were observed in the lower reaches of Miller Brook, but the only gamefish was a single wild brook trout. Other fish species found in the stream include central stoneroller, common shiner, blacknose dace and longnose dace, creek chub, white sucker, and tesselated darter.

See also
Burgess Brook, next tributary of Miller Brook going downstream
Catlin Brook, next tributary of Miller Brook going upstream
List of rivers of Pennsylvania

References

Tributaries of North Branch Mehoopany Creek